Government Model Boys Higher Secondary School, (previously called Government Model High School) is a school in Thycaud, Thiruvananthapuram, India. The school is affiliated to the Kerala State Board of Education and is one of the oldest schools in Kerala.

History

In 1885, a normal school was started in Trivandrum by the government of Travancore for training male teachers. It was situated in the compound where St.Joseph's Higher Secondary school is at present. In 1903 it was shifted to Thycaud. The magnificent main building of the school, an example of European architecture, was built in 1910 during the reign of Maharaja Sree Moolam Thirunal Ramavarma.

The first headmaster was Dr. C F Clarke who served for three years. He lived on the school campus; the house where he stayed remains as Clarke's Bungalow. One of the earliest headmasters of the training college was Shri. P.G. Sadasiva Iyer, who was an M.A. in Chemistry from the Madras Presidency college. The school was the city's first English, Malayalam, Tamil medium school.

Higher secondary school
When the Kerala State Board of Education decided to move the two-year intermediate course (the course between high school and university) from colleges to schools in 1998, Model School was part of the program. As part of this change, the name of the school was changed to Government Model Higher Secondary School.

Notable alumni

 Mohanlal, actor, producer and a recipient of Padma Bhushan
 Sri M, spiritual guide, social reformer, educationist and a recipient of Padma Bhushan
 Kris Gopalakrishnan, co-founder and former executive vice chairman (former co-chairman) of Infosys, former president of Confederation of Indian Industry, chairman of Axilor Ventures
 Jagathy Sreekumar, actor
 Priyadarshan, film director, screenwriter, and producer
 U. Vimal Kumar, former international Badminton player and served as chief national coach of India
 Jagadish, actor, screenwriter, television presenter, and politician
 Maniyanpilla Raju, actor and producer
 Padmakumar, businessman and coach
 Venu Nagavally, film actor, screenwriter and director
 K. B. Ganesh Kumar, actor, television host, and politician. He was the Minister for Forests & Environment, Sports and Cinema in the Government of Kerala
 M. G. Sreekumar, playback singer, composer, music producer, television presenter and film producer
 G. Venugopal, playback singer
 Srinivas, playback singer
 Balabhaskar, was an Indian musician, violinist, composer and record producer
 Raghu Kumar, managing director, Allergan India
 Sooraj Santhosh, Indian playback singer
 Vishnu Vijay, music producer, music director, flautist, and composer
 Nandu, film actor
 Rajeevnath, film director
 S. Krishna Kumar, a politician and former union minister of India
 Babu Divakaran, a politician and a former Kerala state minister
 K. Muraleedharan, a politician and a former Kerala state minister
 M. G. Radhakrishnan, music director and Carnatic vocalist
 Shaji Kailas, film director and scriptwriter
 M. P. Appan, a poet and littérateur
 Sukumar (writer), a popular satirist and cartoonist
 T. N. Gopinathan Nair, Indian Playwright, Novelist
 Dr. A. Marthanda Pillai, neurosurgeon, the recipient of a Padma Shri and managing director of Ananthapuri Hospitals & Research Institute
 Nalini Netto, was a student of the primary section and a former chief secretary, Government of Kerala
 S.George , former Director General of Police and Commissioner of Police of Greater Chennai, Government of TamilNadu
Manu Sudhakaran, Malayalam film director.
G.Rajesh.Writer,Lyricist
D.Ajoykumar,Illustrationist.

References

External links
https://modelschooltvm.com
 Department of higher secondary education, Kerala 

High schools and secondary schools in Thiruvananthapuram
1885 establishments in India
Educational institutions established in 1885